My Husband's Getting Married Today is a 1956 West German comedy film directed by Kurt Hoffmann and starring Liselotte Pulver, Johannes Heesters and Paul Hubschmid.

It was shot at the Bavaria Studios near Munich and in Hamburg. The film's sets were designed by the art director Robert Herlth.

Cast
 Liselotte Pulver as Thesi Petersen
 Johannes Heesters as Robert Petersen
 Paul Hubschmid as Georg Lindberg
 Gustav Knuth as Karl Nielsen
 Charles Regnier as Niki Springer
 Gundula Korte as Karin Nielsen
 Eva Maria Meineke as Betsy
 Ingrid van Bergen as Ulla Radtke, Mannequin
 Ernst Waldow as Direktor Wilhelm Anders
 Lina Carstens as Tante Erna
 Margarete Haagen as Schwester Theophenia
 Werner Finck as Dr. Agartz, Zahnarzt
 Fritz Hinz-Fabricius as Chefarzt des Krankenhauses
 Herta Saal as Frau Nielsen
 Carla Rust

References

Bibliography 
 Robert, Reimer, & Reimer, Carol. The A to Z of German Cinema. Scarecrow Press, 2010.

External links 
 

1956 films
West German films
German comedy films
1956 comedy films
1950s German-language films
Films directed by Kurt Hoffmann
Constantin Film films
Films based on Austrian novels
Comedy of remarriage films
Films set in Hamburg
1950s German films
Films shot in Hamburg
Films shot at Bavaria Studios
German black-and-white films